LibRaw is a free and open-source software library for reading raw files from digital cameras. It supports virtually all raw formats. It is based on the source code of dcraw, with modifications, and "is intended for embedding in raw converters, data analyzers, and other programs using raw files as the initial data."

LibRaw is available for Windows, macOS, Linux and FreeBSD. It is included in many Linux distributions such as Arch Linux, Debian, Fedora, Gentoo Linux, openSUSE, Slackware and Ubuntu.

Software incorporating LibRaw includes digiKam, EasyHDR, gThumb, Gwenview, IrfanView, KStars, OpenImageIO, Siril, and Topaz Studio.

See also
Camera Image File Format
DevIL
Digital Negative
List of cameras supporting a raw format
ORF format

References

External links

Free computer libraries
Graphics libraries
C++ libraries
Free software programmed in C++
Free photo software
Photo software for Linux